Puget Island is a 7.5 sq mi(4,785 acre; 19.365 km) island and Census-designated place (CDP) in the Columbia River in Wahkiakum County, Washington, United States.  The Julia Butler Hansen Bridge (built in 1938) carries State Route 409 across the Cathlamet Channel to connect the island to the town of Cathlamet, Washington.  Route 409 crosses the island to its southern shore, where it connects with the county-operated Wahkiakum County Ferry, Oscar B, providing service to Westport, Oregon. The 2010 census reported a population of 831 persons.

Puget Island's Robert W. Little Preserve is home to a population of endangered Columbian white-tailed deer.

The island was named for Peter Puget, a lieutenant in the Vancouver Expedition of exploration, which first mapped the island in 1792.

References

Puget Island: Blocks 5001 thru 5025, Census Tract 9501, Wahkiakum County, Washington United States Census Bureau

External links
Puget Island section of Lyn Topinka's photo essay Lewis & Clark's Columbia River
WAHKIAKUM COUNTY PUBLIC WORKS DEPARTMENT Ferry Wahkiakum
Puget Island Community Plan, 9/15/04 document on Cowlitz-Wahkiakum Council of Governments website

Census-designated places in Washington (state)
Census-designated places in Wahkiakum County, Washington
Islands of the Columbia River in Washington (state)
Landforms of Wahkiakum County, Washington